Robert Ferguson (August 16, 1834 – September 7, 1901) was an Ontario merchant and political figure. He represented Kent East in the Legislative Assembly of Ontario from 1885 to 1901 as a Liberal member.

He was born in Kilsyth, Stirlingshire, Scotland in 1834, the son of James Ferguson, and came to Howard Township with his family in 1854. He learned carpentry in Scotland and later became involved in the lumber trade in Ontario. Ferguson served as reeve for Camden Township and warden for Kent County. He was elected in an 1885 by-election held after the death of Daniel McCraney. He died at his home in Thamesville, Ontario in 1901.

External links 
The Canadian parliamentary companion, 1891 JA Gemmill

Commemorative biographical record of the county of Kent, Ontario ... (1904)

1834 births
1901 deaths
Immigrants to the Province of Canada
Ontario Liberal Party MPPs
Scottish emigrants to pre-Confederation Ontario
People from Kilsyth
People from Chatham-Kent
Politicians from North Lanarkshire